The 2002 farm bill (P.L. 107–171, Sec. 1301–1310) replaced the longtime (65-year) support program for peanuts with a framework identical in structure to the program for the so-called covered commodities (wheat, corn, grain sorghum, barley, oats, upland cotton, rice, soybeans, and other oilseeds). The three components of the Peanut Price Support Program are fixed direct payments (at $36/ton), counter-cyclical payments (based on a target price of $495/ton), and marketing assistance loans or loan deficiency payments (LDPs) (based on a loan rate of $355/ton). The peanut poundage quota and the two-tiered pricing features of the old program were repealed. Only historic peanut producers are eligible for the Direct and Counter-cyclical Program (DCP). All current production is eligible for marketing assistance loans and LDPs. Previous owners of peanut quota were compensated through a buy-out
program at a rate of 55¢/lb. ($1,100/ton) over a 5-year period.

References 

Peanuts
Agricultural subsidies